Minari is a 2020 American drama film written and directed by Lee Isaac Chung. It stars Steven Yeun, Han Ye-ri, Alan Kim, Noel Kate Cho, Youn Yuh-jung, and Will Patton. A semi-autobiographical take on Chung's upbringing, the plot follows a family of South Korean immigrants who try to make it in the rural United States during the 1980s.

Minari had its world premiere at the Sundance Film Festival on January 26, 2020, winning both the U.S. Dramatic Grand Jury Prize and the U.S. Dramatic Audience Award. It began a one-week virtual release on December 11, 2020, and was released theatrically and via virtual cinema on February 12, 2021, by A24.

The film received critical acclaim, with praise towards Chung's direction and screenplay, Yeun and Youn's performances and the score. Many declared it one of the best films of 2020. It earned six nominations at the 93rd Academy Awards: Best Picture, Best Director, Best Original Score, Best Original Screenplay, Best Actor (Yeun), and Best Supporting Actress (Youn), with Youn winning for her performance, making her the first Korean to win an Academy Award for acting. It also won the Golden Globe Award for Best Foreign Language Film, was nominated for the Screen Actors Guild Award for Outstanding Performance by a Cast in a Motion Picture, and earned six nominations at the 74th British Academy Film Awards, including Best Film Not in the English Language.

Plot 
In 1983, the Korean immigrant Yi family moves from California to their new plot of land in rural Arkansas, where father Jacob hopes to grow Korean produce to sell to vendors in Dallas. One of his first decisions is to decline the services of a water diviner and he digs a well in a spot he finds on his own. He enlists the help of Paul, an eccentric local man and Korean War veteran. While Jacob is optimistic about the life ahead, his wife Monica is disappointed and worries about their son David's heart condition; he is frequently told not to run due to this. Jacob and Monica work sexing chicks at the nearby hatchery and argue constantly while David and his sister Anne eavesdrop.

To help watch the children during the day, they arrange for Monica's mother Soon-ja to travel from South Korea. David, who is forced to share a room with her, avoids her because she does not conform to his idea of how a grandmother should be. Still, Soon-ja attempts to adjust to life in the States and bond with the children. The well that Jacob dug runs dry. Jacob is reluctant to pay for county water, but eventually is forced to do so. He runs into additional difficulties, such as the vendor in Dallas cancelling their order at the last minute. Even so, he perseveres despite Monica's vocal desire to return to California. This brings their marriage closer to a breaking point.

Meanwhile, Soon-ja takes David to plant minari seeds by the creek. She tells him how resilient and useful the plant is, and predicts plentiful growth. David finally begins to warm to his grandmother after she teaches him hwatu, bandages his wounds, and soothes him to sleep. Soon-ja also encourages him to do more physical activity, something his parents discourage, but she says that he is stronger than they think. Soon-ja suddenly suffers a stroke overnight. She survives with medical treatment, but is left with impaired movement and speech.

Jacob, Monica, Anne and David head to Oklahoma City for David's heart appointment and to meet a vendor to sell Jacob's produce. Although they learn that David's heart condition has dramatically improved and Jacob makes a deal to sell vegetables to a Korean grocer, Jacob also indirectly admits to Monica that the success of his crops is more important to him than the stability of their family. Following an emotional argument, the two tacitly agree to separate.

However, Soon-ja accidentally sets the barn containing the produce on fire in their absence. Upon arriving home, Jacob rushes in to save the crops, and Monica soon follows. Eventually, the fire grows out of control, and they decide to save each other while leaving the barn to burn. A distraught and confused Soon-ja begins to wander off into the distance, as Anne and David call for her to come back. Seeing that she is not responding to them, David breaks into a sprint to meet her, blocking her path. Soon-ja seems to recognize David for a moment, and reaches for his hand and the grandchildren lead her back home. The family is asleep on the floor, collapsed from the fatigue of the night before. Above them, Soon-ja is awake, in a chair, watching them sleep with a subdued expression.

Some time later, Jacob and Monica are with the water diviner who finds a spot for a well. They mark it with a stone signifying their intention to stay on the farm. Jacob and David then head to the creek to harvest the minari, which had grown successfully, with Jacob noting how good a spot Soon-ja had picked to plant them.

Cast
 Steven Yeun as Jacob Yi
 Han Ye-ri as Monica Yi
 Alan Kim as David Yi
 Noel Kate Cho as Anne Yi (Ji-young)
 Youn Yuh-jung as Soon-ja
 Will Patton as Paul
 Scott Haze as Billy
 Jacob Wade as Johnnie
 Skip Schwink as Doctor

Production

Development 
Chung had initially hoped to make an adaptation of My Antonia by Willa Cather but found out that Cather did not wish for people to make film adaptations of her works. Chung felt inspiration to make a film about his own rural upbringing. Chung went to a library and wrote down some personal memories that he used as a basis for the story.

Chung wrote the screenplay for Minari in 2018 shortly before taking on an instructor position at the Asia Campus of the University of Utah at Songdo, Incheon, South Korea. Chung drew from his own childhood growing up on a farm in Arkansas. He cited Cather and Fyodor Dostoevsky as inspirations during the writing process, recalling the former's quote "that her life really began when she stopped admiring and started remembering" as a motivation to draw on his own experiences. In an interview with The Los Angeles Times, Chung spoke about the challenges of drawing on his family's experiences, stating "It was very difficult in the sense that I know that my parents are private people. And I didn't even tell them that I was making this film until I was in the editing room with it after I had shot it, because I was just so scared about what they would say."

Chung used English as his medium for writing the script, and the lines spoken in Korean were translated into Korean. These parts were translated into colloquial Korean by translator Hong Yeo-ul, talking to the director and actors.

In early 2019, Christina Oh and Plan B Entertainment signed on as producers on the film. Oh later brought on A24 to distribute the film.

Casting 
In July 2019, it was announced Steven Yeun, Han Ye-ri, Youn Yuh-jung, Will Patton and Scott Haze had joined the cast of the film.

Han Ye-ri initially felt she could not take the role as Monica Yi due to her needing to film Nokdu Flower and had suggested Chun Woo-hee as an alternate as she felt it was important a Korean-born woman portrayed Monica. Han Ye-ri stated that Monica, of the principal characters, "seemed to be the most Korean" due to the character's difficulties with living in the United States, and she felt it was important an actress born in South Korea, natively speaking Korean, take the role.

Filming 
Principal photography began in July 2019 in Tulsa, Oklahoma. Filming lasted 25 days. In order to make a deadline for Sundance, editor Harry Yoon edited the film as production took place.

During filming Han and Youn Yuh-jung lived in the same Airbnb. As Youn Yuh-jung was unknown in the United States, unlike in South Korea where she was a known celebrity and was given a lot of deference, she felt she needed to show her acting skills with a new audience.

Youn Yuh-jung previously lived in the United States and used that experience in her performance. Lee Isaac Chung told her not to play Soon-ja in the way Chung's grandmother was, a move welcomed by Youn Yuh-jung. Chung also took Youn's suggestions, including one where her character takes back money her daughter had just put into a church collection plate, even though Chung's religious background gave him some hesitation about including that idea. According to Youn, Chung intended for Soon-ja to be alive at the end of the story.

Music

Release
The film had its world premiere at the Sundance Film Festival on January 26, 2020. It screened at several film festivals including Deauville, Valladolid, Hamptons, Heartland and Montclair.

Initially, the film was set for release in a limited release on December 11, 2020, before slowly expanding to a wide release on February 12, 2021. However, the theatrical release was curtailed because of the COVID-19 pandemic. It was released in select theaters and virtual cinemas for one week on December 11, 2020. It opened theatrically on February 12, along with virtual cinema screenings through A24's website. It was released on video-on-demand on February 26, 2021.

Reception

Box office and VOD 
, Minari has grossed $3.1 million in the United States and Canada, and $12.5 million in other territories, for a worldwide of $15.5 million.

IndieWire reported the film likely made $150–200,000 from about 245 theaters. It ended making $193,000 on its first weekend. It made an estimated $63,000 in its second weekend and $53,000 in its third, for a running total of $251,000. The same weekend, the film placed fifth on Apple TV's PVOD rental charts, sixth on FandangoNow, and eighth on Google Play. It made $68,000 in its fourth weekend in the U.S., as well as $2.2 million in South Korea and $1 million in Australia and New Zealand, then $56,000 in its fifth weekend. The weekend following its six Oscar nominations, the film made $306,000 from 786 theaters.

Critical response 

The site's critics consensus reads: "Led by arresting performances from Steven Yeun and Yeri Han, Minari offers an intimate and heart-wrenching portrait of family and assimilation in 1980s America." Metacritic assigned the film a weighted average score 89 out of 100, based on 49 critics, indicating "universal acclaim".
 
A. O. Scott of The New York Times gave the film a positive review, writing "Minari is modest, specific and thrifty, like the lives it surveys. There's nothing small about it, though, because it operates at the true scale of life." Nicholas Barber at the BBC rated the film 5/5, stating that "Sensitively written and acted, beautifully shot, and with a charming, sparingly used score, Minari is so engaging that it's easy to forget how radical it is." Reviewing the film for the Associated Press, Lindsey Bahr gave the film 4/4 stars, reporting, "One of the great triumphs of Minari is its presentation of authentic childhood. These kids are not saints or stand-ins or mouthpieces. They are their own persons."
 
Robbie Collin of The Telegraph rated the film 4/5, writing that "Lee Isaac Chung's tender story is a finely-observed portrait of family relations and rural American values". Benjamin Lee at The Guardian also rated the film 4/5, stating "The autobiographical story of a Korean American family trying to sustain a farm in rural Arkansas has deservedly become the festival's most universally loved film".

Minari appeared on 68 critics' year-end top-10 lists, including first place on five year-end lists and second place on nine year-end lists.

Accolades

Minari premiered at the 2020 Sundance Film Festival where it received the U.S. Dramatic Grand Jury Prize and the U.S. Dramatic Audience Award. It was named one of the ten best films of 2020 by the American Film Institute and the National Board of Review, and received six Academy Award nominations. It also received three Screen Actors Guild Award nominations, 10 Critics' Choice Movie Awards nominations, and six Independent Spirit Award nominations.

At the 78th Golden Globe Awards (given by the Hollywood Foreign Press Association), the film won the Best Foreign Language Film. The determination that the film would be eligible for this category rather than Best Motion Picture – Drama, based on the Globes' rule that any film with over 50% of its dialogue not in English would be considered a Foreign Language Film, invited controversy. Lulu Wang, whose film The Farewell was subject to the same rule the previous year, wrote that "I have not seen a more American film than #Minari this year. It's a story about an immigrant family, IN America, pursuing the American dream. We really need to change these antiquated rules that characterize American as only English-speaking." Author Viet Thanh Nguyen wrote that the "decision speaks powerfully to the issue of what makes something — a language or a person or a culture — foreign." Many other filmmakers, actors, and authors, including Daniel Dae Kim, Simu Liu, Harry Shum Jr., Franklin Leonard, Phil Lord, Nia DaCosta, Celeste Ng, Min Jin Lee, and Phillipa Soo criticized the decision on similar grounds.

References

Further reading
 
 Videos

External links
 
 
 Minari - A24 Films
 Original screenplay by Lee Isaac Chung

2020 films
2020 drama films
2020s Korean-language films
American drama films
Asian-American drama films
A24 (company) films
Films about Christianity
Plan B Entertainment films
Films about Korean Americans
Films about father–son relationships
Films about families
Films about farmers
Films about immigration to the United States
Films featuring a Best Supporting Actress Academy Award-winning performance
Films set in 1983
Films set in Arkansas
Films shot in Oklahoma
Best Foreign Language Film Golden Globe winners
Sundance Film Festival award winners
2020s English-language films
2020 multilingual films
American multilingual films
2020s American films
American independent films
2020 independent films